Jacques Henri de Durfort, Duke of Duras (9 October 1625 – 12 October 1704) was Marshal of France.

Life

Jacques Henri was the oldest son of Guy Aldonce de Durfort (1605–1665), marquis of Duras, count of Rozan and of Lorges, maréchal de camp and of Élisabeth de La Tour d'Auvergne, sister of Henri de La Tour d'Auvergne, better known as Turenne.

His brother, Guy Aldonce de Durfort de Lorges, was also a Marshal of France. He served first under his uncle, Turenne, and under Condé ; he distinguished himself at Mergentheim, and  Alerheim.

In 1651, he followed Condé into rebellion, but came back into the service of the king in 1657, with the title of lieutenant-general.  He played a major part in the conquest of Franche-Comté ; and was named by Louis XIV governor of that province and marshal in 1675.  In 1689, he took part in the destruction of the Palatinate during the War of the Grand Alliance.

The Duc de Saint-Simon, who married his niece, speaks highly of him in his memoirs and notes that he was in such favour with Louis XIV that he " could more or less say what he pleased."

Marriage and Children 
He married Marguerite Félice de Lévis, daughter of Charles de Lévis, Duke of Ventadour and Marie de La Guiche. Marguerite Félice was the sister in law of Charlotte de La Mothe Houdancourt and aunt of the Duchess of Rohan-Rohan.. With her he had at least four children:

 Jacques Henri II of Durfort, 2nd Duke of Duras (1670–1697);
 Felice Armande de Durfort (1672–1730), married Paul Jules de La Porte, duc Mazarin, son of Armand Charles de La Porte de La Meilleraye and Hortense Mancini;
 Louise Bernardine de Durfort (1675–1703), married Jean-François Paul de Blanchefort-Créquy (1678–1703), 5th Duke of Lesdiguières, Comte de Sault, Pair de France;
 Jean-Baptiste de Durfort, 3rd Duke of Duras (1684–1770), Marshal of France.

References 

1625 births
1704 deaths
 1
Marshals of France
Converts to Roman Catholicism from Calvinism
French military personnel of the Nine Years' War
French military personnel of the Franco-Dutch War